The Bangladesh women's national football team is the women's national association football team of Bangladesh controlled by the Bangladesh Football Federation under the supervision of the women's football committee. It is a member of the Asian Football Confederation and has yet to qualify for the World Cup or an AFC Women's Asian Cup finals.

Bangladesh are the defending champion at the SAFF Women's Championship, after clinching their maiden title in 2022. They also secured a bronze medal in the South Asian Federation Games 2010 and a silver medal at the SAFF Women's Championship 2016.

History

Origins (2007–2012)
Women's football was introduced in Bangladesh when the nations first ever football tournament dedicated to women was staged under the Vision Asia programme in November 2007. Eight teams from different districts all over the country took part in the tournament. The tournaments success, lead to the Bangladesh Football Federation, organizing the 2008 Women's school football tournament, under the Vision Bangladesh programme. The National Football Championship for women was introduced the subsequent year, for different district teams to take part in. While in 2009, Golam Robbani Choton a veteran in the Dhaka football scene, was put in charge of the inactive women's national team. However, the Bangladesh women's team was continuously neglected throughout the late 2000s. 

Bangladesh played their first international game on 29 January 2010 in against Nepal, during the 2010 South Asian Games, held in Dhaka, losing 1–0. The team impressed in the following fixtures, pulling of two successive victories against, Sri Lanka, and then Pakistan respectively. Although they suffered a 0–7 defeat at the hands of India during their last group stage game, Bangladesh secured the Bronze medal. The team proceeded to take part in the, 2010 SAFF Women's Championship later on that year, which was played on home soil, but this time in Cox's Bazar. They won significantly against Bhutan and Sri Lanka (2–0 and 9–0), however they were defeated by Nepal in the semifinals. 

It was in 2011, when the football federation decided to launch the Bangladesh Women's Football League. The national team was active the following year, taking part in the 2012 SAFF Championship. They lost to India and Sri Lanka, attaining their sole victory against Bhutan, 1–0 thanks to a goal from captain Pru Suinu. Nonetheless, the team failed to advance past the group stages.

Emergence (2013–2020)
After 2012 SAFF Women's Championship, BFF started to make a structure for women's team. On the other hand, government started Bangamata Sheikh Fazilatunnesa Mujib Gold Cup Football Tournament from 2011, where a number of footballers from all-over the country were showcase their footballing skill on a yearly basis, strengthening the national team's pipeline of talents. In October 2014, Norio Tsukitate was appointed as the team's first foreign head coach. Bangladesh team management started almost an year long camp for 2014 SAFF Women's Championship, and Bangladesh team won two of there three Group matches and, reached the semi-finals where Bangladesh lost against Nepal by 1–0. After the tournament concluded Golam Robbani Choton returned to head coach duty.

In the 2016 SAFF Women's Championship, Bangladesh reached to the final having defeated Maldives 6–0 in the semi-final. Nonetheless, the inexperienced team lost 3–1 to India in the Final.  The team's fortunes at the 2019 SAFF Women's Championship did not change, as they lost to India by a margin of 4–0 in the semi-final.

Golden era (2021–present)

Bangladesh did not make to the 2022 AFC Women's Asian Cup qualification. But, after that, Bangladesh played three FIFA Friendly matches, one against Hong Kong where they beat Hong Kong by 5–0 in 2021 and two against Malaysia where they draw one and beat one Malaysia by 6–0 before the 2022 SAFF Women's Championship.

Bangladesh won their all three group matches having defeated Maldives by 3–0, Pakistan by 6–0 and India by 3–0, reached Semi-finals as unbeaten group champion. In the semi-finals having defeated Bhutan by 8–0 and reached the Final. Bangladesh faced Nepal in the final where, Bangladesh clinched their maiden SAFF Women's Championship title with a 3-1 victory over Nepal in an entertaining final at the Dasharath Rangasala in Kathmandu on 19 September 2022.

Team image

Colours
The Bangladesh national football team plays in bottle green shirts and dark red shorts embedded. Also with red and green stripes. Green and red are the historic national colours of Bangladesh, originating from the national flag of Bangladesh. The red represents the sun rising over Bengal, and also the blood of those who died for the independence of Bangladesh. The green stands for the lushness of the land of Bangladesh. The current Bangladesh away jersey is completely diametric to the regular one.

Home stadium

The Bangladesh women's national team plays their home matches at the Bangabandhu National Stadium & Bir Sherestha Shaheed Shipahi Mostafa Kamal Stadium.

Media coverage
Bangladesh's both home and away matches are broadcast live on Bangladesh Television & T Sports.

Results and fixtures

The following is a list of match results in the last 12 months, as well as any future matches that have been scheduled.

Legend

2021

2022

2023

Bangladesh Results and Fixtures – Soccerway.com

Coaching staff

Current coaching staff

Manager history

 Golam Robbani (2009–2014)
 Norio Tsukitate (2014)
 Golam Robbani (2015–present)

Players

Current squad
The following 23 players were called up for the 2022 SAFF Women's Championship.

Caps and goals updated as of 19 September 2022 after the match against .

Recent call-ups
The following players have been called up for the team in the last 12 months.

INJ Withdrew due to injury
PRE Preliminary squad
SUS Suspended

Captains
Trishna Chakma (2009–2012)
Suinu Pru Marma (2012–2014)
Aungmraching Marma (2014–2015)
Sabina Khatun (2015–)

Statistics

*Players in bold are still active with Bangladesh.

Most capped players

Top goalscorers

Competitive record

FIFA Women's World Cup

*Draws include knockout matches decided on penalty kicks.

AFC Women's Asian Cup

*Draws include knockout matches decided on penalty kicks.

AFC Women's Asian Cup qualification

*Draws include knockout matches decided on penalty kicks.

SAFF Women's Championship

*Draws include knock-out matches decided on penalty kicks.

South Asian Games

*Draws include knockout matches decided on penalty kicks.

Head-to-head record

Source: Results

Honours

Regional
 SAFF Women's Championship
Champion: 2022
Runner-up: 2016

See also

 Sport in Bangladesh
 Football in Bangladesh
 Women's football in Bangladesh
 Bangladesh Football Federation
National teams
Women's
 Bangladesh women's national football team
 Bangladesh women's national football team results
 List of Bangladesh women's international footballers
 List of Bangladesh women's national football team managers
 Bangladesh women's national under-20 football team
 Bangladesh women's national under-17 football team
Men's
 Bangladesh men's national team

References

External links
 Bangladesh Football Federation
 Bangladesh FIFA profile

 
Asian women's national association football teams
Women's football in Bangladesh